Surathkal is one of the major localities in the northern part of Mangalore city located on National highway 66 (previously as NH-17) in the Dakshina Kannada district, Karnataka state, India on the shore of Arabian sea. It is a municipality merged with Mangalore City Corporation. It lies between Gurupura (Phalguni) and Pavanje (Nandini) rivers. It is the northern suburb & can be considered as the northernmost area of Mangalore City until Mukka. Surathkal has a railway station on Konkan railway route which connects cities of Mumbai to Mangaluru. Surathkal is 8 km north of New Mangalore seaport, 4 km west of Mangalore Refinery & Petrochemicals Limited and 16 km west of Mangalore International Airport  This region has developed educationally, industrially & commercially can be regarded as one of the crucial localities in Mangaluru & coastal Karnataka. The only NIT of Karnataka is situated here which is adjacent to the national highway NH 66. Mukka a popular name in Indian surfing is also situated close to Surathkal. Surathkal beach is well known for its cleanliness and well maintained like other beaches in Mangalore.

Etymology
According to legend, the name Surathkal is derived from "shiratakal" meaning "headstone" in Tulu. The famous Sadashiva temple on the shores of Arabian Sea (Lakshadweepa Samudra) is said to be built around the linga that a Rakshasa by name Kharasura carried on his head. Another legend is that when Ravana threw in fit of rage the atma shivalinga, some of the pieces from shivalinga fell at place where Sadashiva temple is situated at present. Noted historian Padoor Gururaj Bhat is of opinion the temple might have been constructed around 11 C.E. (11 A.D).

Administration
Surathkal was once a Grama panchayat, then town panchayat, municipality vide Government notification No.S.O. 2658 dated 31 December1974 now merged with Mangalore City Corporation. Surathkal was once a separate constituency of Karnataka Legislative Assembly. Now it has been renamed as Mangalore City North (Vidhan Sabha constituency) after change in its geographical limits and it comes under Dakshina Kannada (Lok Sabha constituency) at present. The Suratkal legislative assembly constituency was part of Udupi (Lok Sabha constituency) till the year 2009.

Education
Surathkal is home to one of India's premier technical institutes - The National Institute of Technology Karnataka (NITK), formerly known as Karnataka Regional Engineering College (KREC). Surathkal also houses Vidyadayanee High School and Govindadasa College run by Hindu Vidyadayanee Sangha, Surathkal.
Other notable educational institutes include Sri Mahalingeshwara English Medium school, NITK English Medium School, Holy Family School and Anjuman English Medium High School, Mukka. The Srinivas Institute of Medical Science and Research Centre is located in Mukka, Surathkal.

Travel
Surathkal can be easily accessed by various bus services from Statebank by both city buses and the Mangalore-Udupi Express buses. The nearest airport is Mangalore International Airport (Bajpe), 16 kilometres from Surathkal that connects Mangalore with major cities in southern and western India as well as many major cities in the Middle East, with direct flights available to Dubai, Doha, Muscat and Abu Dhabi. Surathkal railway station, which is located 2 km away from the National Institute of Technology campus and half kilometre from national highway NH-66 falls on the famed Konkan railway route on which Rajdhani, Duronto, and other express trains ply regularly from Mangaluru to Mumbai, Thane, Ernakulam, Gujarat and New Delhi. The nearest metropolitan cities, Mumbai and Chennai, are 16 hours away by train. The Mangalore Sea Port (NMPT) is situated 8 km away from this town on the Arabian Sea and primarily used for importing and exporting goods all over the world.

Places Of Interest
Surathkal Beach. There is a lighthouse at Suratkal beach which was commissioned in 1972 A.D.(C.E)

National Institute of Technology Karnataka.

NITK Beach.

Abish Mall

Kudva's Grandeur Shoping Mall

Surathkal Lighthouse.

Krishnapura matha

Shri Sadashiva Mahaganapati Temple.

Iddya Shri Mahalingeshwara Temple.

Padre Shree Dhoomavati Temple, Padre.

Shri Ganesha Bhajana Mandira (R.) Janatha Colony.

Geography
Surathkal is located at 12°58'60 N 74° 46' 60E. The maximum and minimum temperature in a year varies between 37 °C and 25 °C. But  ambient temperature occasionally touches 40 °C during summer season (usually March, April, May) recorded in 21st century.

Industry

Some of the major industries in and around Surathkal are MRPL, BASF and   MCF. The Baikampady Industrial Estate is located at around 6 kilometres from Surathkal and houses many small and medium-sized industries.  The raw materials to these industries are imported through the NMPT and goods produced here are exported to several places in India and abroad through this port.

See also
 Mangalore
 Economy of Mangalore
 NITK Surathkal
 NITK Beach
 Sasihithlu beach
 Panambur beach
 NMPT

External links

 Surathkal

References

Localities in Mangalore